Muhammad Abdul Hamid is Bangladeshi economist, researcher, writer and academician. He was 3rd vice chancellor (from 18 June 1991 to 21 March 1995) of Islamic University, Bangladesh. He was prominent professor Economics department at Rajshahi University. He directly contribute to return IU campus from Kushtia city to Shantidanga previous main campus.

Early life and education 
He was student of Rajshahi University. After complete his graduation, he apply his Economics department lecturer position and he nominate as a lecturer in Economics department at Rajshahi University.

Career 
Abdul Hamid join Economics department at Rajshahi University as a lecturer. He promote to professor in his University. He is Bangladeshi researcher about economic growth and development, economics crises etc.

Appoint IU VC 
Muhammad Abdul Hamid nominate for vice chancellor of Islamic University in 18 June 1991 order by President Shahabuddin Ahmed. Then Islamic University academic activity was held in Kushtia city with some temporary building. Abdul hamid able to return campus now place for her attention and hard work.

Professor of Islamic University Muid Rahman said,

He open Science and Technology faculty with science related department. He was forced to resign from the post of vice-chancellor due to the influence of local politics in the university teacher recruitment. He left in Islamic University in 21 March 1995, He act as vice chancellor during 3 years 9 months 3 days.

Bibliography

Publications 
Muhammad Abdul Hamid has many research and journal publications about 38 publications in 6 languages. Most influence and important journal below with reference.
 Integrated rural development programme : an evaluation of Natore and Gaibandha projects -  Publish: 1975
 A Study of the BADC Deep Tubewell Programme in the Northwestern Region of Bangladesh.- Publish: 1977
 Review of land acquisition process : with reference to DFC-I & DFC-II projects. - Publish: 1975.
 Shallow tubewells under IDA credit in north west Bangladesh - Publish: 1982
 Low lift pumps under IDA credit in south east Bangladesh: a socio-economic study. - Publish: 984
 Survey on privatization of repair & maintenance facilities for Irrigation - Publish: 1984
 Employment generation, poverty-reduction, and sixth five year plan (FY2011-FY 2015) : role of Rajshahi Krishi Unnayan Bank to implement the plan-  Publish:2012

Book 
 Ganamilan-an Evaluation Report-  Publish: 1975
 Irrigation technologies in Bangladesh  - Publish: 1978 BC
 Swanirvar Gram Sarker and the Case of Sadullapur Model - Publish: 1980
 Lathyrism in Bangladesh : an agro-economic survey of two Lathyrismprone areas - Publish: 1986.

References 

Living people
20th-century Bangladeshi economists
Bangladeshi male writers
Vice-Chancellors of the Islamic University, Bangladesh
Year of birth missing (living people)
Academic staff of the University of Rajshahi
University of Rajshahi alumni
21st-century Bangladeshi economists